Malcolm Jean Ahmed Cazalon (born 27 August 2001) is a French professional basketball player for Mega Basket of the Basketball League of Serbia.

Early life 
Cazalon was born in Roanne, France, where his father Laurent Cazalon was a professional basketball player. He began playing basketball as a child with local club Chorale Roanne. In 2017, he moved to ASVEL, with whom he played in the LNB Espoirs under-21 league.

Professional career 
On 23 August 2018, Cazalon signed a three-year contract with JL Bourg of the LNB Pro A, the top professional league in France. On 19 July 2019, he was loaned to Leuven Bears of the Pro Basketball League (PBL) in Belgium.

On March 10, 2020, Cazalon has signed with Mega Bemax of the Basketball League of Serbia. Following the 2020–21 season, Cazalon declared for the 2021 NBA draft. On July 19, 2021, he withdrawn his name from consideration for the 2021 NBA draft. In April 2022, Cazalon declared for the 2022 NBA draft. Later, he withdrawn his name from consideration for the 2022 NBA draft. On 4 July 2022, Cazalon signed a one-year contract extension with Mega Basket.

National team career 
Cazalon missed the 2017 FIBA U16 European Championship in Podgorica, Montenegro, in which France won the gold medal, with a knee injury. At the 2018 FIBA Under-17 Basketball World Cup in Argentina, he averaged 16.4 points, 4.4 rebounds, and 2.1 assists per game, helping France win the silver medal.

References 

2001 births
Living people
ABA League players
Basketball League of Serbia players
French expatriate basketball people in Belgium
French expatriate basketball people in Serbia
French men's basketball players
JL Bourg-en-Bresse players
KK Mega Basket players
Leuven Bears players
Shooting guards
Sportspeople from Roanne